Eric Kibanza Lundoloki  (born April 4, 1980 in Kinshasa) is a DR Congolese judoka, who played for the lightweight category. Kibanza represented the Democratic Republic of the Congo at the 2008 Summer Olympics in Beijing, where he competed for the men's 73 kg class. He lost the first preliminary match to Tajikistan's Rasul Boqiev, who scored a waza-ari awasete ippon at about four minutes. Because Boqiev advanced further into the semi-finals, Kibanza offered another chance for a bronze medal by entering the repechage rounds. He was eventually beaten with a yuko by Ukraine's Gennadiy Bilodid in the first round.

References

External links
 
 
 

Democratic Republic of the Congo male judoka
1980 births
Living people
Olympic judoka of the Democratic Republic of the Congo
Judoka at the 2008 Summer Olympics
Sportspeople from Kinshasa
21st-century Democratic Republic of the Congo people